Aeropostal Cargo de Mexico was a cargo airline based in Mexico City, Mexico, operating on-demand flights within the Americas using leased aircraft.

History 

The airline was founded by Jesus Villegas and started operations in Mexico City on September 6, 2001..

In 2010, the airline was shut down.

Fleet 

As of March 2010 the Aeropostal Cargo de Mexico fleet consisted of only one  Douglas DC-8-63F aircraft.:

References 

Defunct airlines of Mexico
Defunct cargo airlines
Airlines established in 1991
Airlines disestablished in 2010
2010 disestablishments in Mexico
Cargo airlines of Mexico
Mexican companies established in 1991